Vladimir Karfík (26 October 1901 – 6 June 1996) was a Czech modernist architect and university professor. His life, professional career and his work reflected changes characteristic for the 20th century.

Career
Karfík cooperated with many famous creators of the modern architecture all over the world. His architecture from in all periods of his life is very understandable and universal. The most important part of it was represented by function, construction, economy and beauty. Among other works, he designed Baťa's Skyscrape in Zlín. Karfík was one of a number of Czech architects to design the "Bata houses" and Bata shoe factory at East Tilbury, England.

Gallery

References

1901 births
1996 deaths
People from Idrija
Czechoslovak architects
Czech Technical University in Prague alumni